Niccolò Antonelli (born 23 February 1996) is an Italian Grand Prix motorcycle racer, who most recently competed in the 2022 Moto2 World Championship, riding for Mooney VR46 Racing Team. Antonelli won the Italian 125GP Championship in 2011.

Career

Junior career
In 2010, Antonelli competed in the 2010 Red Bull MotoGP Rookies Cup, finishing 8th overall with 56 points, and scoring points in all rounds except the first race in Germany. In 2011, Antonelli became the winner of Italian 125GP Championship, at only age 15.

Moto3 World Championship

San Carlo Gresini Moto3 (2012)
The debut season for Antonelli in Grand Prix racing came in 2012, riding for the San Carlo Gresini Racing team. He showed pace and some consistency straight away, with two fourth place finishes in France and Germany as his best results of the year. Antonelli finished his rookie season 14th in the championship with 77 points.

Junior Team GO&FUN Moto3 (2013–2014)
Antonelli started the 2013 Moto3 World Championship with higher expectations, but pushed too hard and crashed too often. He began the season with 4 straight crashes and DNFs, finishing the season with 6 total, and only scored 47 points, enough for 16th in the final standings.

Staying with Gresini Racing, the 2014 Moto3 World Championship was much of the same, another crash-filled season for Antonelli, with a total of 6 crashes and DNFs. His season's best finish was 5th in Assen, with a pole position coming in the last race at Valencia, but only finished 14th in the final standings, with 68 points.

Ongetta-Rivacold (2015–2016)
After disappointing seasons, Gresini and Antonelli parted ways. Racing for the new Rivacold Honda team, 2015 was the bounce-back year for Antonelli. After taking his first pole position the year prior, he took his first Moto3 podium and victory at the 2015 Czech Republic Grand Prix. Antonelli, who started the race from pole position, dropped to sixth on the opening lap but worked his way up the order to retake the lead on the penultimate lap, and held on to win ahead of Enea Bastianini and Brad Binder. He scored two third place finishes in the following races in Britain and San Marino, and added a second win later in the season at Motegi. Antonelli had a total of 4 podiums in the season, finishing 5th in the final standings with 174 points, in front of riders like Brad Binder, Fabio Quartararo, Francesco Bagnaia, and Jorge Martín.

For the 2016 Moto3 World Championship, Antonelli was considered one of the title favourites, and started the season accordingly, winning the season opening race in Qatar. He would struggle throughout the rest of the season however, finishing the season with no other podiums, and two big crashes, one of which fractured his leg in Germany, causing him to miss a race. He ended the year 11th in the standings, with only 91 points.

Red Bull KTM Ajo (2017)
Leaving the Rivacold Honda team for Red Bull KTM Ajo Motorsport, Antonelli was partnered by Bo Bendsneyder for the 2017 Moto3 World Championship. Both riders struggled, Antonelli finishing the season with only one podium, a second place in Japan, which amounted for more than half of his 38 points for the year.

Sic58 Squadra Corse (2018–2020)
Being let go by the Ajo team, Antonelli signed with Sic58 Squadra Corse for the 2018 Moto3 World Championship, partnering Tatsuki Suzuki. Although not scoring any podiums, Antonelli had a better year, scoring 71 points, and finishing 15th in the standings.

Staying with Squadra Corse for the 2019 season, Antonelli scored his fourth and final victory in the Moto3 class in Jerez, and it was his only podium finish of the season. Following a crash in the San Marino Grand Prix, Antonelli missed the next two races in Aragón and Thailand, before making his return in Japan where he took pole position, but only finished the race in 12th. After being mathematically eliminated from championship contention, Antonelli sat out the last two races of the season in Australia and Valencia, to focus on rehab. Despite missing four races, he still managed to finish 7th in the standings, with 128 points, four points ahead of teammate Tatsuki Suzuki.

Staying with Squadra Corse for his final contract year, Antonelli was once again partnered by Tatsuki Suzki in the 2020 season. Fortunes would be flipped however, with Antonelli having a woeful year, no podiums and only 40 points in the entire season, while Suzuki scored three pole positions in the first three races, winning a race in Jerez, and coming in third place in San Marino.

Avintia Esponsorama Moto3 (2021)
Leaving Sic58 Squadra Corse and Tatsuki Suzuki, Antonelli would switch to Avintia Esponsorama Racing for the 2021 season. Antonelli started the season well, finishing third in the second race of the season at Doha. The middle of the season saw him constantly finish in the points, before his yearly recurring big crash in Austria caused him to miss two races, in which he was replaced by Elia Bartolini. He returned in Silverstone finishing second, before finishing fifth in Aragón, and another second place finish in Rimini, which was his tenth podium in the Moto3 category. He ended the year well, with a pole position turned 6th place in Misano, a third place podium finish in Portimao, and a ninth place in Valencia. Antonelli finished his final year of Moto3 sixth in the championship standings, with 152 points, his best tally since 2015.

Moto2 World Championship

Mooney VR46 Racing Team (2022)
In November 2021, following Marco Bezzecchi's promotion to MotoGP, it was announced by Pablo Nieto that Antonelli will be promoted to race in the 2022 Moto2 World Championship, for Mooney VR46 Racing Team, partnering Celestino Vietti.

The year was met with difficulties and he ended the season as the only full-time rider without scoring a point, finishing the year in 36th place out of 43 riders. His best race was at Spielberg. Qualifying P25, a lot of falls raised him to 16th place, just 6 seconds shy of his first points. He was supposed to stay with the team (now renamed Fantic Motor) for 2023, but was unexpectedly replaced during the winter for Borja Gomez. Antonelli will race on the European Moto2 Championship in 2023.

Moto2 European

Team MMR (2023)
In the 2023 season he races with Team MMR in the FIM JuniorGP Moto2 World Championship.

Career statistics

Grand Prix motorcycle racing

By season

By class

Races by year
(key) (Races in bold indicate pole position, races in italics indicate fastest lap)

References

External links

1996 births
Living people
Italian motorcycle racers
Moto3 World Championship riders
Sportspeople from the Province of Rimini
Moto2 World Championship riders